Interhome AG is a pan-European company headquartered in Glattbrugg near Zurich, specialising in the rental of holiday homes and holiday apartments. It is a wholly owned subsidiary of the Hotelplan Group, which is part of the Migros Corporation. The company is one of the biggest holiday property providers in Europe with around 35,000 properties in 27 countries. Accommodation is supplied to over 553,000 guests per year.

The company employs around 340 workers, and recorded a turnover of 182.9 million Swiss Francs in 2013/2014.

History 
The company was founded in London in 1965 by Bruno Franzen and Werner Frey under the company name Swiss Chalets, and later renamed Interhome after a merger in 1977. The company was taken over by Hotelplan in 1989.

In 1984, the company launched its „migratory bird“ logo, which still serves as an identifying feature even after the Corporate Design was rebranded in 2008.

Its Internet presence was established in 1998; online bookings have been possible since 1999.  In 2009, the proportion of online bookings stood at around 60 per cent.

In 2011, Hotelplan announced its acquisition of Germany’s market leader  Inter Chalet Ferienhaus by 1 November 2013. In 2012, Interhome agreed an ‘exclusive partnership’ with travel website TripAdvisor.

References 

Hospitality companies of Switzerland
Migros
Swiss companies established in 1965
Hospitality companies established in 1965
Opfikon
Companies based in the canton of Zürich